Jeffrey Michael Frazier (born August 10, 1982) is an American former professional baseball outfielder who played with the Detroit Tigers of Major League Baseball in 2010.

Career

Amateur career
Frazier played on Toms River, New Jersey, little league teams that made the 1995 Little League World Series and 1996 Junior League World Series. He attended Toms River High School South, where he was named The Star-Ledgers state player of the year in 2001.

Frazier attended Rutgers University and played for the Rutgers Scarlet Knights baseball team. In 2003, he played collegiate summer baseball with the Chatham A's of the Cape Cod Baseball League and was named a league all-star.

Minor leagues
The Detroit Tigers selected Frazier in the third round of the 2004 Major League Baseball draft. In 2007, he was traded to the Seattle Mariners for Yorman Bazardo. He signed with the Tigers as a minor league free agent following the 2007 season. He would stay in the Tigers organization through the 2010 season, making a brief Major League appearance in 2010.

In 2011, he signed with the Washington Nationals organization with an invitation to Spring Training, but was ultimately sent down to their farm team, the Syracuse Chiefs. He spent the beginning of the 2012 season with Reynosa Broncos of the Mexican league before being placed on waivers and resigning with the Toledo Mud Hens the AAA team of the Detroit Tigers. In 2012, he played for the Iowa Cubs, the Triple-A affiliate of the Chicago Cubs.

Major leagues
He was promoted to the major leagues on July 29, 2010. On July 31, 2010, he recorded his first big league hit.  He stayed on the Tigers roster for about two weeks before being been sent down to the Mud Hens.

Personal life
His younger brother, Todd Frazier, has played in Major League Baseball. Jeff still lives in New Jersey and runs a baseball clinic called “Frazier Baseball” located in Toms River at the Toms River little league field known as Frazier Field with his older brother, Charlie. Jeff is currently a gym teacher at Toms River High School South.

References

External links

1982 births
Living people
American expatriate baseball players in Mexico
Broncos de Reynosa players
Chatham Anglers players
Detroit Tigers players
Erie SeaWolves players
High Desert Mavericks players
Iowa Cubs players
Lakeland Tigers players
Major League Baseball left fielders
Major League Baseball right fielders
Mexican League baseball first basemen
Mexican League baseball left fielders
Oneonta Tigers players
Rutgers Scarlet Knights baseball players
Sportspeople from Point Pleasant, New Jersey
Sportspeople from Toms River, New Jersey
Syracuse Chiefs players
Toledo Mud Hens players
Toms River High School South alumni
West Michigan Whitecaps players
West Tennessee Diamond Jaxx players
American expatriate baseball players in the Dominican Republic
Estrellas Orientales players
Tomateros de Culiacán players